Bobon, officially the Municipality of Bobon, is a 4th class municipality in the province of Northern Samar, Philippines. According to the 2020 census, it has a population of 25,964 people.

Geography
The town borders with Catarman in the east and San Jose in the west.

Barangays
Bobon is politically subdivided into 18 barangays.

Climate

Demographics

Economy

Education

Balat Balud Elementary School
ETBMSF- Eladio T. Balite Memorial School of Fisheries
CRAFTSMEN- Bobon School For Philippine Craftsmen
PCU- Philippine Christian University (Asia College)
BCES- Bobon Central Elementary School
SES- Salvation Elementary School
MES- Magsaysay Elementary School
DES- Dancalan Elementary School
AES- Acereda Elementary School
JPLES- Jose P. Laurel Elementary School
TES- Trujillo Elementary School
Seno Memorial Institute (formerly Bobon Catholic Institute) - not in operation anymore as of 14 October 2008
 Quezon Elemtary School
Santander Elemtary School
E.duran Elemtary School
San Isidro Elemtary School
Somoroy Elemtary School
Calantiao Elemtary School
Arellano Elemtary School

References

External links
 [ Philippine Standard Geographic Code]
 Philippine Census Information
 Local Governance Performance Management System

Municipalities of Northern Samar